Fun Factory is the second single album by South Korean girl group Fromis 9. The album was released on June 4, 2019 by Off the Record and distributed by Stone Music. The physical version of the single album is available in two versions: "Fun" and "Factory". Both of them consist of the same three songs, including the lead single "Fun!".

Background and release
On May 22, it was revealed that Fromis 9 would come back on June 4 with their first single album Fun Factory.

Concept images were released on May 23 and music video teasers featuring each of the members were released from May 24 to June 2.

The single contains three tracks, including the lead single "Fun!", "Love RumPumPum" and "Fly High". The members Song Ha-young and Park Ji-won wrote and composed the song "Fly High".

The music video teaser was released on May 31 and the full music video was released on June 4 together with the single release.

Promotion
The group began promoting the single "Fun!" on June 6. They first performed the lead single on Mnet's M Countdown, followed by performances on KBS' Music Bank, MBC's Show! Music Core and SBS' Inkigayo.

After finishing the promotions for "Fun!", it was announced that the group would carry out an additional round of performances, this time promoting the B-side "Love RumPumPum". The first performance was on Music Bank on June 12.

Track listing

Charts and Sales

Release history

Notes

References

2019 albums
Fromis 9 albums
Korean-language albums
Hybe Corporation albums